7th Tactical Squadron (known as 7.ELT - 7 Eskadra Lotnictwa Taktycznego in Poland) is a fighter squadron of Polish Air Force established in 1999. The squadron is stationed in 33rd Air Base and operates Su-22 attack aircraft.

Squadrons of the Polish Air Force